Davide Ceci (born 6 September 1993) is an Italian male track cyclist, representing Italy at international competitions. He competed at the 2016 UEC European Track Championships in the team sprint event.

References

1993 births
Living people
Italian male cyclists
Italian track cyclists
Place of birth missing (living people)
People from Ascoli Piceno
Cyclists from Marche
Sportspeople from the Province of Ascoli Piceno